The Blanche river is a tributary of the Bourbon River which flows into the Bécancour River.

The Blanche river flows in the municipalities of Saint-Pierre-Baptiste, Laurierville (Sainte-Julie sector) and Plessisville (parish), in the L'Érable Regional County Municipality (MRC), in the administrative region of Centre-du-Québec, in province of Quebec, in Canada.

Geography 

The main neighboring hydrographic slopes of the Blanche River are:
 north side: Bécancour River, Bourbon River, Manningham stream, Noire River;
 east side: Bécancour River, Noire River, McKenzie River;
 south side: Moulin brook, Charles brook, Bulstrode River;
 west side: Savane stream, Bourbon River, Bulstrode River, Bécancour River.

The Blanche River has its source at Lac Camille, located in Saint-Pierre-Baptiste.

  westward, up to the municipal limit of Laurierville (Sainte-Julie sector);
  towards the west, crossing the southern part of the territory of Laurierville¸ (Sainte-Julie sector);
  towards the southwest, crossing the northern part of the territory of Saint-Pierre-Baptiste, passing north of Mont Apic, up to the municipal limit of Plessisville (parish);
  north-westerly, in the municipality of Plessisville (parish), to the Lachance road bridge;
  southwest, to route 165;
  towards the southwest, until its confluence.

The Blanche river empties on the south-eastern bank of the Bourbon River downstream of the "Savane stream", south of the village of Plessisville (town).

Toponymy 
The toponym "rivière Blanche" was made official on March 6, 1970, at the Commission de toponymie du Québec.

See also 

 List of rivers of Quebec

References 

Rivers of Centre-du-Québec
L'Érable Regional County Municipality